Kitja may be,

Kitja people, Australia
Kitja language, Australia
Kitja Boorn (spearwood)